Kandilli Earthquake Museum, or more formally Museum of Kandilli Observatory and Earthquake Research Institut, is a museum devoted mainly to seismology and earthquake science in Turkey. It is situated within the campus of Kandilli Observatory in Kandilli neighborhood of Üsküdar district in Istanbul.

Owned by the Boğaziçi University, the museum was opened on June 21, 2006, and is housed in a renovated building, which was constructed in 1934 as a laboratory for seismography. In the museum, various scientific instruments are on exhibition that were used in astronomical and geoscientific works. There are also old books on display that are hand-written in Turkish, Arabic and Persian language about astronomy, astrology, mathematics and geography.

References

Üsküdar
Museums in Istanbul
Science and technology museums in Turkey
Museums established in 2006
2006 establishments in Turkey
Boğaziçi University
Earthquakes in Turkey
University museums in Turkey
Earthquake museums